Ferdowsi (Ferdausi) (Persian title: Ferdosi- )  is a 1934 Iranian biography drama film directed by Abdolhossein Sepanta and starring Nosratollah Mohtasham, Abdolhossein Sepanta and Sohrab Pouri.

The movie is about the famous Iranian poet Ferdowsi, author of the Shahnameh book of epic poems.

See also
 A New Prologue to the Shahnameh

References

External links

1934 films
Films directed by Abdolhossein Sepanta
1930s biographical drama films
1930s Persian-language films
Works based on Shahnameh
Iranian black-and-white films
Iranian drama films
Iranian biographical films
1934 drama films
Biographical films about poets
Ferdowsi